The perfective aspect (abbreviated ), sometimes called the aoristic aspect, is a grammatical aspect that describes an action viewed as a simple whole; i.e., a unit without interior composition. The perfective aspect is distinguished from the imperfective aspect, which presents an event as having internal structure (such as ongoing, continuous, or habitual actions). The term perfective should be distinguished from perfect (see below).

The distinction between perfective and imperfective is more important in some languages than others. In Slavic languages, it is central to the verb system. In other languages such as German, the same form such as ich ging ("I went", "I was going") can be used perfectively or imperfectively without grammatical distinction. In other languages such as Latin, the distinction between perfective and imperfective is made only in the past tense (e.g., Latin veni "I came" vs. veniebam "I was coming", "I used to come"). However, perfective should not be confused with tense—perfective aspect can apply to events in the past, present, or future.

The perfective is often thought of as for events of short duration (e.g., "John killed the wasp"). However, this is not necessarily true—a perfective verb is equally right for a long-lasting event, provided that it is a complete whole; e.g., Tarquinius Superbus regnavit annos quinque et viginti (Livy) "Tarquin the Proud reigned for 25 years." It simply "presents an occurrence in summary, viewed as a whole from the outside, without regard for the internal make-up of the occurrence."

The perfective is also sometimes described as referring to a "completed" action, but it would be more accurate to say that it refers to an action or situation that is seen as a complete whole; e.g., the Russian perfective future  "I shall kill you" refers to an event that has not yet been completed.

The essence of the perfective is an event seen as a whole. However, most languages that have a perfective use it for various similar semantic roles—such as momentary events and the onsets or completions of events, all of which are single points in time and thus have no internal structure. Other languages instead have separate momentane, inchoative, or cessative aspects for those roles, with or without a general perfective.

Equivalents in English
English has neither a simple perfective nor imperfective aspect; see imperfective for some basic English equivalents of this distinction. 

When translating into English from a language that has these aspects, the translator sometimes uses separate English verbs. For example, in Spanish, the imperfective sabía can be translated "I knew" vs. the perfective supe "I found out", podía "I was able to" vs. pude "I succeeded", quería "I wanted to" vs. quise "I tried to", no quería "I did not want to" vs. no quise "I refused". The Polish perfective aspect is translated into English as a simple tense and the imperfective as a continuous; for example the imperfective "oglądałem" is translated into "I was watching", while the perfective "obejrzałem" is translated into "I watched". Such distinctions are often language-specific.

Marking 

Languages may mark perfective aspect with morphology, syntactic construction, lexemes/particles, or other means.
 Older Germanic languages: the aspect prefixes ge- (in Old English), gi- (in Old Saxon and Old High German), and ga- (in Gothic) indicate perfective aspects of verbs.
 Thai: the aspect marker ขึ้น , grammaticalized from the word for "ascend," indicates a certain type of underconstrained perfective aspect when it follows a main verb
Hindi: the perfective aspect is marked using the perfective aspect participle. The perfective participle is constructed as shown in the table below, the consonant -य्- (-y-) is added to the perfective suffix when the verb root ends in a vowel.

Perfective vs. perfect
The terms perfective and perfect should not be confused.

A perfect tense (abbreviated  or ) is a grammatical form used to describe a past event with present relevance, or a present state resulting from a past situation. For example, "I have put it on the table" implies both that I put the object on the table and that it is still there; "I have been to France" conveys that this is a part of my experience as of now; and "I have lost my wallet" implies that this loss is troublesome at the present moment. A perfect tense does not necessarily have to be perfective in aspect. For example, "I have been waiting here for an hour" and "I have been going to that doctor all my life" are perfect but also imperfective in aspect. 

There are some languages, however, such as Modern Greek, in which the perfect tense is always perfective.

Examples

Hindustani 

Hindustani (aka Hindi-Urdu) has 3 grammatical aspectsː Habitual, Perfective and Progressive. Each aspect is constructed from its participle and a number of auxiliary verbs can be used with the aspectual participles such asː honā (to be, to happen), rêhnā (to stay, to remain),  jānā (to go), ānā (to come), and karnā (to do). These verbs themselves can be made into aspectual participles and can be used with the default auxiliary verb honā (to be), hence forming sub-aspects that combine the nuance of two aspects. The auxiliary rêhnā (to stay) gives a nuance of continuity of the perfective state, jānā (to go) is used to construct the passive voice (in its habitual subaspect) and also shows that the action is completed (in its perfective subaspect), karnā (to do) gives the nuance that the perfective action is repeated habitually.

Conjugating the auxiliary verbs which are in the infinitive form above into their aspectual forms using the auxiliary honā (to be) gives the following subaspectual forms of the perfective aspect in their infinitive formː

See also
 Ancient Greek verbs: Meanings of the tenses
 Chinese grammar: Aspects
 Grammatical aspect in Slavic languages

Notes

External links 
 Greek tenses

Grammatical aspects